The 1973 Colorado Buffaloes football team represented the University of Colorado in the Big Eight Conference during the 1973 NCAA Division I football season. Led by tenth-year head coach Eddie Crowder, the Buffaloes were 8–3 in the regular season (4–3 in Big 8, tied for third), and played their home games on campus at Folsom Field in Boulder, Colorado.

In the Gator Bowl, Colorado fell to sixth-ranked Auburn to finish at 8–4, and dropped to sixteenth in the final AP poll.

Schedule

Source:

Roster
TE J.V. Cain, Jr.

Rankings

Game summaries

Oklahoma

Source: Ocala Star-Banner

References

External links
University of Colorado Athletics – 1972 football roster
Sports-Reference – 1972 Colorado Buffaloes

Colorado
Colorado Buffaloes football seasons
Colorado Buffaloes football